High Lake is a natural spring-fed lake in Marshall County, South Dakota within the Lake Traverse Indian Reservation.

High Lake earned its name as it is located at the top of a 600m plateau.

References

Lakes of South Dakota
Lakes of Marshall County, South Dakota